Yadanar Htae Ka Yadanar is a 2017 Burmese drama television series. It aired on MRTV-4, from January 30 to March 24, 2017, on Mondays to Fridays at 19:00 for 40 episodes.

Synopsis
A Dragon King and a Dragon Queen were playing happily in a long and beautiful river that existed thousands of years ago.

The Dragon King also helped in the battle, and the Dragon King died in great pain due to the attack of Garuda King.  Before the Dragon King's death, with the Dragon King's curse, he vomited blood three times from his mouth and turned into jewels.  The story begins with the wrath of the Dragon Queen, who witnessed the tragedy.

Knowing that the Dragon King and the Garuda King were successful businessmen at this time, the Dragon Queen wanted to be reunited with her lover. The story of Yadanar Htae Ka Yadanar became a story set in the pursuit of humanity with the intention of seeking revenge with resentment.

Cast

Main cast
Aung Min Khant as Nay Thura, Dragon King
Myat Thu Thu as La Yake Nwe, Dragon Queen
Kaung Myat San as Aung Thakhin

Supporting
So Pyay Myint as Min Yan
Phyo Than Thar Cho as Amara
Wyne Shwe Yi as Su Waddy
Kaung Sitt Thway as ?
Thun Thitsar Zaw as Ma Eain, Snake Girl
Su Hlaing Hnin as Daw Ni Ni Khaing
Phu Sone as Daw Kalyar
Ye Aung
Zin Myo

References

External links

Burmese television series
MRTV (TV network) original programming